Francesco Quintavalla (born 26 June 1982) is an Italian professional footballer who plays for Savona.

He played one game in the Serie A in the 2000/01 season for Bologna F.C. 1909.

External links
 

1982 births
Living people
Italian footballers
Serie A players
Bologna F.C. 1909 players
F.C. Lumezzane V.G.Z. A.S.D. players
S.P.A.L. players
Association football midfielders